The state auditor of Missouri is an elected constitutional officer in the executive branch of government of the U.S. state of Missouri. Thirty-eight individuals have occupied the office of state auditor since statehood. The incumbent is Scott Fitzpatrick, a Republican.

Election and qualification
The state auditor serves a four-year term, and is the only state executive branch official elected in even-numbered non-presidential election years. To be eligible for the office of state auditor, a candidate must meet the same eligibility requirements prescribed for the governor.

Powers and duties
The state auditor is charged by Article IV, Section 13 of the Missouri Constitution with supervising and auditing the receipt and expenditure of public funds and prescribing appropriate systems of accounts for all public offices, be they state agencies or local governments. In relation to the aforesaid local governments, the same constitutional provisions also require the state auditor to supervise their budgeting systems. In accordance with this mandate, the state auditor conducts financial and performance audits for approximately 200 state agencies, boards, and commissions, and the state's judicial branch. The state auditor also audits counties, cities, school districts, and other political subdivisions at the auditor's initiative, whenever they lack an external auditor, or when requested by citizen petition.

Missouri's state auditor is one of only four elected auditors in the United States whose core responsibilities are codified in the state constitution. The other state auditors to which this phenomenon applies are the auditors in New York, Utah, and Washington.

Recent history
The office was temporarily held by John Watson after Tom Schweich, who was elected in 2010 and reelected in 2014, died on February 26, 2015. Nicole Galloway was appointed by Governor Jay Nixon to fill the office on a permanent basis until the 2018 election, effective on April 27, 2015, and was subsequently elected to a full term. Scott Fitzpatrick was elected as State Auditor in 2022, and took office on January 9, 2023.

List of State Auditors of Missouri

References

Official Manual, State of Missouri, 2005–2006.

External links
Publications by or about the Office of the Missouri State Auditor at Internet Archive.

 
MIssouri